World Series of Poker: Tournament of Champions is a video game based on the popular gambling tournament World Series of Poker and the second licensed WSOP video game released for home video game systems, after the World Series of Poker video game.  It was released for Xbox 360, PlayStation 2,  Wii, PlayStation Portable and Microsoft Windows.

Reception

The game received "mixed or average reviews" on all platforms except the Wii version, which received "generally unfavorable reviews", according to the review aggregation website Metacritic.

Sequel
In 2007, the sequel to WSOP:TOC was released, titled World Series of Poker 2008: Battle for the Bracelets.  It is available on the PlayStation 2, Microsoft Windows and all major seventh-generation platforms except the Wii.

References

External links

2006 video games
Activision games
Left Field Productions games
PlayStation 2 games
PlayStation Portable games
Poker video games
Wii games
Windows games
Xbox 360 games
World Series of Poker video games
Video games developed in the United States
Multiplayer and single-player video games